Lucerne is an unincorporated community and a U.S. Post Office in Weld County, Colorado, United States.  The Lucerne Post Office has the ZIP Code 80646.

The post office has been in operation since 1892. The community was named after the lucerne that grew near the original town site.

Geography
Lucerne is located at  (40.481948,-104.698162).

References

Unincorporated communities in Weld County, Colorado
Unincorporated communities in Colorado